"Take Me Away" is a 1994 song recorded by Dutch group Twenty 4 Seven. It was released as the third single from their second album, Slave to the Music (1993). Unlike previous singles from the album, the song did not feature any raps. The single achieved success on the charts in Europe, but didn't perform on the charts in the US. ("Slave to the Music" and "Leave Them Alone" were their only minor hits there.)

Chart performance
"Take Me Away" was a major hit on the charts in Europe. It made it to the top 10 in both Iceland and Spain, peaking at number 10 in both countries. The single was a top 20 hit in Denmark, Finland, Germany and the Netherlands. In Germany, it spent 19 weeks inside the German Singles Chart. Additionally, "Take Me Away" reached the top 30 in Austria, Belgium and Sweden, as well as on the European Hot 100 Singles, where it hit number 25. In Switzerland, it was a top 40 hit. It didn't perform on the charts in the UK or the US.

Music video
A music video was produced to promote the single, directed by Fernando Garcia. It was shot in Johannesburg, Durban, and Cape Town in South Africa. Parts of the video has a sepia tone. It was uploaded to YouTube in April 2013. As of September 2020, the video has got more than 545,000 views.

Track listing

 Vinyl 7" (Germany) - ZYX Music
 "Take Me Away" (Single Mix) — 3:36
 "Take Me Away" (E&M Club Mix) — 5:00

 Vinyl 12" (Germany) - ZYX Music
 "Take Me Away" (Single Mix) — 3:36
 "Take Me Away" (RVR Long Version) — 5:44
 "Is It Love" (Ferry & Garnefski Club Mix) — 5:53
 "Take Me Away" (E&M Club Mix) — 5:00

 Vinyl 12" (Netherlands) - Indisc
 "Take Me Away" (Single Mix) — 3:36
 "Take Me Away" (RVR Long Version) — 5:44
 "Is It Love" (Ferry & Garnefski Club Mix) — 5:53
 "Take Me Away" (E&M Club Mix) — 5:00

 CD single (Australia) - Possum
 "Take Me Away" (Single Mix) — 3:36
 "Take Me Away" (E&M Club Mix) — 5:00
 "Is It Love" (Ferry & Garnefski Club Mix) — 5:53
 "Take Me Away" (RVR Long Version) — 5:44

 CD single (Netherlands) - Indisc
 "Take Me Away" (Single Mix) — 3:36
 "Take Me Away" (E&M Club Mix) — 5:00

 CD maxi (Netherlands) - Indisc
 "Take Me Away" (Single Mix) — 3:36
 "Take Me Away" (E&M Club Mix) — 5:00
 "Is It Love" (Ferry & Garnefski Club Mix) — 5:53
 "Take Me Away" (RVR Long Version) — 5:44

 CD maxi (Germany) - ZYX Music
 "Take Me Away" (Single Mix) — 3:36
 "Take Me Away" (E&M Club Mix) — 5:00
 "Is It Love" (Ferry & Garnefski Club Mix) — 5:53
 "Take Me Away" (RVR Long Version) — 5:44

Charts

Weekly charts

Year-end charts

References

1994 singles
Twenty 4 Seven songs
1994 songs
CNR Music singles
ZYX Music singles
Songs written by Ruud van Rijen